The Agency of Deposit Compensation, ADC — Belarusian organization, providing deposit insurance of deposits of natural persons. It was created in December, 2008 in compliance with Belarusian laws. Yauhen Yawlashkin was appointed as its general director.

Each bank or savings and loan organization in Belarus, having the ability of deposit formation, should be registered in the ADC.

An unlimited state guarantee was announced since July 31 2009 (except deposits belonging to the individuals registered as sole traders). Interest yields insurance is not guaranteed by the law.

The Agency of Deposit Compensation is a public institution and is accountable to the Council of Ministers of Belarus and to National Bank of Belarus.

References

External links 

 Official web-page
 Information about ADC at National Bank of the Republic of Belarus

Bank regulation
Consumer organizations in Belarus
Deposit insurance
2008 establishments in Belarus